Anal columns (Columns of Morgagni or less commonly Morgagni's columns) are a number of vertical folds, produced by an infolding of the mucous membrane and some of the muscular tissue in the upper half of the lumen of the anal canal. They are named after Giovanni Battista Morgagni, who has several other eponyms named after him.

References

External links
  — "The Female Pelvis: The Rectum"
 

Digestive system